Iragberi is a town located a few kilometres from Ede, Osun State, Nigeria with a population of approximately 50,000 people.

The town's principal occupation is farming; the varied crop selection includes cocoa, coffea, cassava, maize, beans, yam and kola nuts, and others.

The first ruler of Iragberi was Oba Akoni-Agogo; he was said to be an emigrant from Ẹfọ̀n-Alààyè. The title of the town's traditional ruler is 'Aragberi', which is derived from 'Aragbori', meaning "the thunder conquers" . The current Aragberi of Iragberi is Oba Folorunsho Agboade Makanju PhD., who was crowned in 2014.

The neighboring towns include Awo, Iwoye, Ara and Aato. Iragberi is one of the major towns in Egbedore Local Government, area of Osun State, Nigeria. The sons and daughters of this ancient town are well read and traveled.

The town has two major tourist centres, but they are no longer functional; the first is the Palm Tree with Two Heads, while the second one is Woru Chain (a place where one of the powerful ancestors inhumed/concealed himself in land).

References

Populated places in Osun State